Gladstone Port City Power is a Queensland State League (QSL) basketball club based in Gladstone, Queensland. The club fields a team in both the Men's QSL and Women's QSL in the 2021 competition. The club is a division of Gladstone Amateur Basketball Association (GABA), the major administrative basketball organisation in the region. The Power play their home games at Kev Broome Stadium.

Club history
The Power entered the Queensland Australian Basketball League (QABL) in 2004, fielding both a men's and women's team. They replaced the departing Tweed Coast Slammers in the Southern Cross Division.

In 2009, the Power women had a massive year to become champions for the first time in club history. Some excellent recruiting and a lot of belief enabled the Power to defeat the South West Metro Pirates 102–98 in overtime in the grand final. It was a remarkable turnaround for the team, who won just a handful of matches in their two previous seasons. WNBL players Jessica Bibby, Natalie Hurst and Katie Rose and college player Diana Neves were the stars of the show. The women went on to claim three QBL championships in a row with titles also coming in 2010 and 2011. Player/coach Jessica Bibby was instrumental over those years, as was Natalie Hurst. They returned to the grand final once again in 2012, but their quest for a four-peat was denied by the Mackay Meteorettes, who defeated the Power 78–71.

In 2015, the Power men qualified for the finals for the first time in club history thanks to the efforts of import duo Justin Baker and Ray Willis, captain Michael Cedar, and head coach Derek Rucker. Their 12–5 record saw them finish the regular season in fourth place. In their quarter-final match-up, they faced the defending champion Rockhampton Rockets and beat them 94–86. The win advanced them through to the semi-finals, where they faced the Brisbane Capitals. The Power pushed the Capitals into overtime but were defeated in the dying seconds of the extra period, losing 78–77. The Power women, on the other hand, made their way back to the grand final for the first time since 2012. However, they were defeated 2–0 in the best-of-three series by the Rockhampton Cyclones.

Following the 2019 QBL season, the league was rebranded as NBL1 North. The Power subsequently did not enter the new competition for the 2020 season.

For the 2021 season, the Power will play in the Queensland State League competition.

References

External links

2004 establishments in Australia
Basketball teams established in 2004
Basketball teams in Queensland
Gladstone, Queensland
Queensland Basketball League teams